Lucey is an Irish, British, American and Canadian surname. 
Lucey has two distinct possible origins: of Norman origins derived from Latin personal name Lucius; of Gaelic origins derived from Old Gaelic Ó Luasaigh, anciently Mac Cluasaigh. Alternative spellings are: Lucy, Lucie, Luci, Luce. Lucey is also a toponomastic name in France.

Lucey may refer to the following people:

 Cornelius Lucey (1902–1982), Irish Catholic bishop
 Donna Lucey, American writer
 Dorothy Lucey (born 1958), American entertainment reporter
 George Kenneth Lucey Jr. (born 1937), American engineer
 Harry Lucey (1913–1984), American comics artist, primary artist of Archie comics
 Joe Lucey (1897–1980), American Major League Baseball infielder/pitcher
 Patrick Lucey (1918–2014), American politician, governor of Wisconsin
 Patrick J. Lucey (Illinois lawyer) (1871–1947), American politician
 Robert Emmet Lucey (1891–1977), American Roman Catholic archbishop
 Roger Lucey, South African musician, journalist, film maker
 Stephen Lucey (born 1980), Irish sportsperson

See also 
 Luce (name)
 Lucy
 Luci
 Lucie
 De Lucy

English-language surnames
Irish families
Surnames of Irish origin